Liam Paul McMorrow (born July 22, 1987) is a Canadian professional basketball player.

Player profile
McMorrow is a former ice hockey player in his native Canada who only took up basketball seriously in 2008. He went undrafted in the 2012 NBA draft but has since shown a lot of improvement in stints in leagues around the world. His most recent stint was with the Halifax Rainmen of NBL Canada, where his team lost Game Seven of their championship game against Windsor Express by forfeiture. The Rainmen refused to play the deciding Game Seven at the Windsor Express’ home floor in Windsor, Ontario for "fear of their safety", following the 2015 NBL Canada Finals brawl.

In June 2015, McMorrow joined the Los Angeles Clippers summer league team which participated in the 2015 NBA Summer League Orlando League.

In October 2019, McMorrow joined the Formosa Dreamers of the ASEAN Basketball League. He was born in Vancouver, British Columbia, McMorrow played college basketball at Marquette University and Tennessee Tech.

The Basketball Tournament
Liam McMorrow played for Team Eberlein Drive in the 2018 edition of The Basketball Tournament. Eberlein Drive made it to the championship game before falling to Overseas Elite.

Personal life
McMorrow is the youngest of four children. He is the son of Sheila McMorrow. His brother, Sean, was a professional hockey player.

References

1987 births
Living people
Barako Bull Energy players
Basketball players from Vancouver
Canadian expatriate basketball people in the United States
Canadian expatriate basketball people in Taiwan
Canadian expatriate basketball people in the Philippines
Canadian men's basketball players
Centers (basketball)
Halifax Rainmen players
Iowa Energy players
Nanjing Tongxi Monkey Kings players
Marquette University alumni
Oklahoma City Blue players
Philippine Basketball Association imports
Tennessee Tech Golden Eagles men's basketball players
Formosa Dreamers players
Fubon Braves players
Taiwan Beer basketball players
Bank of Taiwan basketball players
Yulon Luxgen Dinos players
Super Basketball League imports